The Maurice Crumpacker House is the former residence of Maurice E. Crumpacker, a popular Oregon attorney and United States Congressman in the 1920s.

The house was built by Portland architect Wade Hampton Pipes in 1923, and is located in the Dunthorpe neighborhood of Multnomah County, Oregon, just outside the Portland municipal boundary. It was added to the National Register of Historic Places in 1992.

References

External links

Houses completed in 1923
Houses on the National Register of Historic Places in Portland, Oregon
1923 establishments in Oregon
Portland Historic Landmarks